An oak leaf is the leaf of an oak.

Oak leaf or Oakleaf may also refer to:

Botany
 oak leaf lettuce, from the Lactuca sativa group

Military 
 Oak leaf cluster, a U.S. military decoration
 A bronze oak leaf device, used to signify a Mention in Despatches in Commonwealth militaries
 A silver oak leaf device, used to signify the award of the Queen's Commendation for Valuable Service in Commonwealth militaries
 Oak leaves awarded to holders of some categories of the German Iron Cross
 Golden oak leaf, insignia of rank of Major (United States)
 Golden oak leaf, insignia of rank of Lieutenant commander (United States)
 Silver oak leaf, insignia of rank of Commander (United States) 
 Silver oak leaf, insignia of rank of Lieutenant colonel (United States)
 Golden oak leaf, insignia of the United States Navy Supply Corps

Geography
 Oak Leaf, Texas, a city
 Oakleaf Lake, a lake in Minnesota

Others
 Any member of the butterfly genus Kallima
 The species Kallima knyvetti
 RFA Oakleaf, Royal Fleet Auxiliary ship names
 Oakleaf Brewery, a brewery in England